= Nausimachion =

Coastal town of ancient Bithynia

Coordinates: 41°03′34″N 29°03′13″E

Nausimachion was a coastal town of ancient Bithynia located on the Bosphorus.

Its site is located south of Vaniköy in Asiatic Turkey.
